The 2000 Western Illinois Leathernecks football team represented Western Illinois University as a member of the Gateway Football Conference during the 2000 NCAA Division I-AA football season. They were led by second-year head coach Don Patterson and played their home games at Hanson Field. The Leathernecks finished the season with a 9–3 record overall and a 5–1 record in conference play, making them conference champions. The team received an automatic bid to the NCAA Division I-AA Football Championship playoffs, where they lost to Lehigh in the first round. The team was ranked No. 12 in The Sports Network's postseason ranking of Division I-AA.

Schedule

References

Western Illinois
Western Illinois Leathernecks football seasons
Missouri Valley Football Conference champion seasons
Western Illinois Leathernecks football